Maurizio Battistini (born 5 April 1957) is a Sammarinese alpine skier. He competed in two events at the 1976 Winter Olympics. In 1986 he joined the board of the "Gente del Titano" association formed by San Marino citizens living in Rimini, serving as its president from 1987 to 1993. In 2004, he received the appointment of San Marino consul at the Consulate of the Republic of San Marino in Rimini.

References

1957 births
Living people
Sammarinese male alpine skiers
Olympic alpine skiers of San Marino
Alpine skiers at the 1976 Winter Olympics
Place of birth missing (living people)